The GAT convoys were a series of Caribbean convoys which ran during the Battle of the Atlantic in World War II.

They take their name from the route: Guantanamo, Cuba to Curaçao, Aruba and Trinidad

Overview 
The GAT series was the reverse of TAG series that ran from August 1942 until 18 May 1945. There were 209 GAT convoys, comprising 3,696 individual ship listings. The escort ships for these convoys are not listed in the reference cited. Some of the ships listed in a convoy did not always make the complete trip between Guantanamo and Trinidad though. Some may have traveled as far a Curaçao, others would join and Curaçao and sail on to Trinidad, while others may have left to go to Kingston, Jamaica, San Juan, Puerto Rico or Puerto Plata.

Two convoys were successfully attacked by U-boats during 1942 and 1943, in which three ships were lost.

Convoy List

1942 

1943 

1944

1945

Notes 
Citations

Bibliography 

Books
 
 
 
Online resources

External links 
 Full listing of ships sailing in GAT convoys

GAT 0
Battle of the Atlantic
Caribbean Sea operations of World War II